The 2020 Scottish Women's Premier League, known as the Scottish Building Society Scottish Women's Premier League for sponsorship reasons, was due to be the 19th season of the Scottish Women's Premier League, the highest division of women's association football in Scotland since its inception in 2002. The league was split into two divisions - SWPL 1 with eight teams and SWPL 2 with 10 teams. Glasgow City are the defending champions. Heart of Midlothian joined the SWPL 1 as the promoted club from the 2019 SWPL 2, replacing Stirling University. Aberdeen, Queen's Park and Boroughmuir Thistle joined the SWPL 2 as the promoted clubs from the SWFL. No teams were relegated as the league was expanded from eight teams to 10.

The season started on 21 February 2020 and was scheduled to end in November 2020, but was interrupted by the coronavirus pandemic. In July 2020, the 2020 season was declared null and void. A new season is due to start in October 2020 and end in June 2021, with the league reverting to a winter season format.

Teams

SWPL 1

Source:

SWPL 2

Source:

SWPL 1

League table

Note: Season voided after one match

Positions by round

Results

Matches 1 to 14

Matches 15 to 21

SWPL 2

League table

Note: Season voided after one match

Positions by round

Results

References

External links
 Official website

Scot
Scottish Women's Premier League seasons
Premier League
Association football events curtailed and voided due to the COVID-19 pandemic